Indica is classical Greek and Latin for "of India".

Historical ethnographic accounts of India

 Indica (Arrian), Arrian's account of Nearchus' voyage from India 
 Indica (Ctesias), a recording of the beliefs of the Persians about India by the classical Greek author Ctesias
 Indica (Megasthenes), his account of his travels in India
 Indica, Al-Biruni's account of his travels in India

Arts
 Indica (Argentine band)
 Indica (Finnish band)
 Indica Gallery, a London art gallery in the 1960s
 Indica Watson, English actress

Brands and companies
 Indica Records, an independent record label founded by the band GrimSkunk
 Tata Indica, an automobile by Tata Motors, India

Other
Cannabis indica

See also

 Indicus (disambiguation)
 Indicum (disambiguation)